Dr Junaid Ismail Dockrat is a South African Dentist who has recently been listed by the UN Security Council as a terror suspect along with his cousin Farhad Ahmed Dockrat for the alleged links with the terrorist organization Al-Qaeda. This was at the request of the United States Government who describe he and Farhad Ahmed Dockrat as being terrorism "facilitator(s) and terrorist financier(s)". He currently resides in Mayfair, a suburb of Johannesburg. The South African Government has requested proof that he and his cousin are indeed involved with Al-Qaeda  and the pair deny the claims.

Notes

South African dentists
Living people
Year of birth missing (living people)